Madhukarrao Chavan is an Indian politician from Maharashtra state. He is currently serving his 5th term in the Maharashtra Legislative Assembly. He was the cabinet  Minister of Maharashtra Govt of Animal Husbandry, Dairying, Fisheries Department. Indian National Congress leader is the MLA of Tuljapur Vidhan Sabha constituency in Osmanabad district elected in 2014 state general elections.

Chavan is a resident of Andur in Tuljapur Taluka. He is a president and chairman of many co operative, education institutions. He is contesting Assembly elections from 1985. In 1985, he lost to Padmasingh Patil in Osmanabad constituency. But in 1990, he won in Tuljapur constituency. Again in 1995, he lost to Manikrao Khapale of SKP. From 1999, he is winning the Tuljapur constituency for consecutive four times{1999, 2004, 2009, 2014}.

References

Marathi politicians
Living people
Maharashtra MLAs 2009–2014
People from Osmanabad district
Maharashtra MLAs 1990–1995
Year of birth missing (living people)
Indian National Congress politicians from Maharashtra